Kevin Georgiou (born 22 May 1985), known professionally as K Koke, is an English rapper. He is best known for his "Are You Alone" Diss track and Fire in the Booth freestyle on Charlie Sloth's show on BBC Radio 1Xtra, which has accumulated over 20 million YouTube views.

Music career
His first mixtape, Pure Koke Volume One, was given away for free on various online outlets. Following extensive radio play, he signed a deal with Roc Nation.

At the time of signing to Roc Nation, Georgiou was preparing to release Pure Koke Volume Two. He released visuals for singles "Nobody But Us" feat Abel Miller, "Lord Knows" feat Don Jaga and "Streets Are Cold" which features Birmingham's UK rap veteran Malik MD7. However, his music career was stopped abruptly as he was arrested for attempted murder. This meant Pure Koke: Volume 2 was released with very little promotion due to his disappearance.

Georgiou was later dropped from Roc Nation and in 2015 signed with Universal Music.

Attempted murder trial
Georgiou was charged with the attempted murder of an unidentified 27-year-old football player at Harlesden station on 9 March 2011 along with associate named Levi who was remanded in custody pending trial in October 2011. The victim was shot in the back. Georgiou stood trial on 4 October 2011 and was acquitted of all charges on 3 November 2011 after seven months on remand.

Discography

Albums

Extended plays

Mixtapes

Singles

References

1985 births
Living people
Roc Nation artists
English hip hop musicians
English male rappers
English people of Greek Cypriot descent
Rappers from London
Gangsta rappers
People from the London Borough of Brent